Remember is the third studio album by Rusted Root, released in 1996.  It has since been certified Gold in the United States. The song "Virtual Reality" was used in the 1996 film Twister.

Track listing
All songs written by Michael Glabicki except where noted.
 "Faith I Do Believe" – 4:31
 "Heaven" – 4:00
 "Sister Contine" – 5:13
 "Virtual Reality" – 3:21
 "Infinite Space" – 4:12
 "Voodoo" – 6:12
 "Dangle" (Liz Berlin, Glabicki) – 4:19
 "Silver-N-Gold" (Berlin, Glabicki) – 4:26
 "Baby Will Roam" – 4:24
 "Bullets in the Fire" – 5:05
 "Who Do You Tell It To" – 4:12
 "River in a Cage" – 4:43
 "Scattered" – 4:29
 "Circle of Remembrance" – 6:17

Personnel
Liz Berlin  – Guitar, Arranger, Tambourine, Vocals, Penny Whistle, Djembe, Sleigh Bells
John Buynak  – Flute, Mandolin, Guitar (Electric), Photography
Daniel Chase  – Stick
Jim DiSpirito  – Dumbek, Cymbals, Sax (Soprano), Stick, Tabla, Tambourine, Timbales, Bells, Shaker, Dhol, Riqq, Taos Drum, Log Drums
Jim Donovan  – Dumbek, Drums, Stick, Vocals, Agogo Bell, Granite Block, Tibetan Finger Cymbals
Michael Glabicki  – Guitar (Acoustic), Mandolin, Guitar (Electric), Vocals, Vocals (background), Guitar (12 String), Slide Guitar, Guitar (Classical)
Jerry Harrison  – Piano, Producer, Djembe
Patrick Norman  – Bass, Piano, Guitar (Electric), Vocals, Organ Arrangement
Michael Railton  – Organ, Organ Arrangement
Mike Speranzo  – Guitar, Arranger

Production
Tim Bomba  – Producer, Engineer
Chris Collins  – Assistant Engineer
Karl Derfler  – Engineer, Mixing
Greg Forsberg  – Assistant Engineer
David Gleeson  – Assistant Engineer
Mauricio Iragorri  – Assistant Engineer
Ted Jensen  – Mastering
Claudius Kumar  – Assistant Engineer
Bob Levy  – Assistant Engineer
Josh Kiser - Assistant Engineer
Tom Lord-Alge  – Remixing, Mixing
Sandra Monteparo  – Design
Rick Patrick  – Art Direction
Rusted Root  – Producer
Dana Tynan  – Photography

Notes 

1996 albums
Albums produced by Jerry Harrison
Rusted Root albums
Mercury Records albums
PolyGram albums